No. 191 Squadron was a Royal Air Force squadron. During World War I it was a non-operational night training unit, while during World War II it was engaged in maritime reconnaissance.

History

Formation in World War I
No. 191 Squadron was formed at RAF Marham on 6 November 1917 as a night training squadron, operating amongst others the Royal Aircraft Factory FE.2bs and FE.2ds. The squadron moved to RAF Upwood in 1918 and was disbanded there in January 1919.

Reformation in World War II
The squadron was re-formed on 13 May 1943 at Korangi Creek, India. The squadron operated the Consolidated Catalina to patrol the Persian Gulf and the western Indian Ocean.
The squadron moved to Red Hills Lake, India in November 1944. The Catalina's continued to carry out anti-submarine patrols and meteorological flights. The squadron disbanded on 15 June 1945 at RAF Koggala, Ceylon.

Aircraft operated

See also
List of Royal Air Force aircraft squadrons

References

Notes

Bibliography

 Halley, James J. The Squadrons of the Royal Air Force & Commonwealth 1918–1988. Tonbridge, Kent, UK: Air Britain (Historians) Ltd., 1988. .
 Jefford, C.G. RAF Squadrons, a Comprehensive record of the Movement and Equipment of all RAF Squadrons and their Antecedents since 1912. Shrewsbury, Shropshire, UK: Airlife Publishing, 1988 (second edition 2001). .
 Rawlings, John D.R. Coastal, Support and Special Squadrons of the RAF and their Aircraft. London: Jane's Publishing Company Ltd., 1982. .
 Sturtivant, Ray, ISO and John Hamlin. RAF Flying Training And Support Units since 1912. Tonbridge, Kent, UK: Air-Britain (Historians) Ltd., 2007. .

External links
 History of No.'s 191–195 Squadrons at RAF Web

Military units and formations established in 1917
191 Squadron
Aircraft squadrons of the Royal Air Force in World War II
1917 establishments in the United Kingdom